Vernon, also known as the Anna Maria Ward House, was a historic plantation house located near Mount Olive, Wayne County, North Carolina.  It was built about 1837, and was a two-story, five bay by two bay, Federal style frame dwelling.  It sat on a brick pier foundation and one-story shed porch that replaced a mid-19th century two-story porch of Italianate design. It has been demolished.

It was listed on the National Register of Historic Places in 1974.

References

Plantation houses in North Carolina
Houses on the National Register of Historic Places in North Carolina
Federal architecture in North Carolina
Houses completed in 1837
Houses in Wayne County, North Carolina
National Register of Historic Places in Wayne County, North Carolina